Princess Darejan, known in Russia as the tsarevna Darya Aleksandrovna Gruzinskaya (died 1796) was a Georgian royal princess (batonishvili) of the Bagrationi dynasty. She was a daughter of Prince Alexander of Kartli.

She was married to Prince Pyotr Sergeyevich Troubetzkoy (1760–1817) and had four children:
Sergey Trubetzkoy (1790-1860)
Alexander Trubetzkoy (1792-1853)
Pyotr Trubetzkoy (1793-1840)
Elizaveta Trubezkaya (1796-1870)

References

1796 deaths
Princesses from Georgia (country)
House of Mukhrani
Year of birth missing
Deaths in childbirth
Trubetskoy family